Valentin de Vargas (born Albert Charles Schubert; April 27, 1935 – June 10, 2013) was an actor known for appearing in films in the 1950s and 1960s. Two of his prominent roles were as a gangster threatening Janet Leigh in Orson Welles' Touch of Evil (1958) and playing Luis Francisco Garcia Lopez in Hatari! (1962).

Biography
After serving in the United States Army, de Vargas made his film debut in The Blackboard Jungle while still attending Loyola Marymount University. He had responded to a flyer posted at Loyola to audition for a high school student role in the film.  He had a variety of uncredited appearances in films and appeared in several television series until Touch of Evil in 1958, where he also met his first wife, actress Arlene McQuade. He travelled to Mexico, where he played one of the Mexican bandidos in The Magnificent Seven (1960).

In the 1960s he appeared on television programs including Bonanza, Daniel Boone, The Wild Wild West, That Girl S3, E2, Gunsmoke, Death Valley Days, The High Chaparral, Mission: Impossible,  Barnaby Jones, The Streets of San Francisco, and Dallas. He later operated a realty firm, Schubert-DeVargas Realty, in Santa Fe, New Mexico. In 1962 he joined the cast of international stars in Howard Hawks' Hatari!.

Death
After suffering for many months from myelodysplastic syndrome, he died on June 10, 2013, aged 78, in Tulsa, Oklahoma. His interment was at Santa Fe National Cemetery.

His first wife was actress Arlene McQuade, who died in 2014. He was a nephew of actor Don Alvarado

Partial filmography

Blackboard Jungle (1955) - Latino Student (uncredited)
The Girl He Left Behind (1956) - Diaz (uncredited)
The Big Caper (1957) - Gas Station Attendant (uncredited)
Ten Thousand Bedrooms (1957) - Reporter (uncredited)
Tip on a Dead Jockey (1957) - Spanish Official (uncredited)
Touch of Evil (1958) - Pancho
The Girl Most Likely (1958) - Young Daddy (uncredited)
The Magnificent Seven (1960) - Santos, Calvera Henchman (uncredited)
The Nun and the Sergeant (1962) - Rivas
Hatari! (1962) - Luis Francisco Garcia Lopez
The Firebrand (1962) - Joaquin Murieta
Hellfighters (1968) - Amal Bokru
Incident on a Dark Street (1973) - Ernesto De La Pina
The Bears and I (1974) - Sam Eagle Speaker
Treasure of Matecumbe (1976) - Charlie
Fast Forward (1985) - M.C
To Live and Die in L.A. (1985) - Judge Filo Cedillo
Exiled in America (1992) - Rene Castillo
This World, Then the Fireworks (1997) - Mexican Doctor (final film role)

References

External links
 

1935 births
2013 deaths
Deaths from myelodysplastic syndrome
Male actors from Albuquerque, New Mexico
American male film actors
American male television actors
Burials at Santa Fe National Cemetery
Loyola Marymount University alumni